Euschoengastia is a genus of mites in the family Trombiculidae.

References

Trombiculidae